Drawn Inward is an album by British saxophonist and improvisor Evan Parker's Electro-Acoustic Ensemble recorded in 1998 and released on the ECM label.

Reception

The AllMusic review by Steve Loewy awarded the album 4 stars stating "Evan Parker has performed in so many contexts, but he seems to have hit a particular stride with his Electro-Acoustic Ensemble, a strange combination of saxophones, strings, and electronics. What makes this so exceedingly attractive is the continuous wonder that permeates throughout... Parker fans that have not heard this group before may be surprised at the results. Although the saxophonist embraces his now well-known advanced techniques, they are clearly subordinate to the project. At times there is a busy intensity to it all, at others a serene quality. Highly complex strokes for an increasingly intricate society, perhaps, where moods change and so do their contexts. Don't file under easy listening".  

The authors of the Penguin Guide to Jazz Recordings wrote: "this is very much a collaborative project and not just an Evan Parker project. Wachsmann and Guy are absolutely central to the multi-dimensional harmonic language, while Lytton's percussion is ever more subtly dramatic."

Writing for All About Jazz, Glenn Astarita commented: "On many occasions, the musicians invoke the sensation of performing on some sort of imaginary plane as the music stretches outward or conveys a truly expansive landscape that seems infinite or unending... here are no preordained ground rules as the exhaustive intercommunication, inexplicable themes and unique phraseology should supply enough data or stimulus to keep us pondering for a good 65 minutes or so..."

Track listing
All compositions by Evan Parker except as indicated
 "The Crooner (For Johnny Hartman)" (Evan Parker, Philipp Wachsmann) - 9:13   
 "Serpent in Sky" - 7:30   
 "Travel in the Homeland" (Paul Lytton) - 7:58   
 "Spouting Bowl" (Lawrence Casserley) - 2:56   
 "Collect Calls (Milano-Kingston) (Bugged)" (Parker, Walter Prati) - 10:38   
 "Aka Lotan" (Parker, Wachsmann) - 4:24   
 "Reanascreena" (Barry Guy) -  5:43   
 "At Home in the Universe (For Stuart Kauffman)" - 3:20   
 "Writing on Ice" (Wachsmann) - 3:43   
 "Phloy in the Frame" (Parker, Lytton) - 3:49   
 "DrawnInward" - 5:59   
Recorded at Gateway Studios in Kingston in December 1998.

Personnel
 Evan Parker - tenor saxophone, soprano saxophone, khene
 Barry Guy - double bass
 Paul Lytton - percussion, live-electronics
 Philipp Wachsmann - violin, viola, live electronics, sound processing
 Walter Prati - live electronics, sound processing
 Marco Vecchi - live electronics, sound processing

References

ECM Records albums
Evan Parker albums
1999 albums